The Haifa Hawks are an Israeli ice hockey team based in the city of Haifa. They participate in the Israeli League, the top level of Israeli ice hockey.

History
The Hawks were founded in 1990, and have won the Israeli League title six times, in 2006, 2007, and 2008, and 1990, 1991, 1994 (the name of club was HC HAIFA)

Achievements
Israeli champion (6): 1990, 1991, 1994, 2006, 2007, 2008

Notable players
 Alon Eizenman
 Oren Eizenman
 Daniel Spivak

References

External links
  Hawks Haifa Official website
 Haifa Hawks on hockeyarenas.net

Ice hockey teams in Israel